Kayal is a 2021 Indian Tamil-language language Family drama series premiered on 25 October 2021 on Sun TV and it is available for worldwide streaming on Sun NXT. The show is produced by Vision Time Pvt. Ltd. The series stars Chaitra Reddy and Sanjeev Karthick

Synopsis 
Kayal, a hardworking woman is the only earner in her family. She faces many hurdles in her life, like her younger sister's wedding, an uncle determined for her downfall, and workplace harassment, and the story revolves around how she bravely fights these problems.

Cast

Main 
 Chaitra Reddy as Kayalvizhi alias Kayal 
 Sanjeev Karthick as Ezhilarasan alias Ezhil / Kabilan

Supporting
 Vazhakku En Muthuraman as Dharmalingam 
 Gopi as Vignesh 
 Ishwarya Ravichandran as Devi
 Meenakumari as Kamatchi
 Avinash Ashok / Harry / Jeeva Rajendran as Anbu
 Ayyappan as Moorthy
 Hema Srikanth as Vedhavalli Chandrasekar
 Abinavya Deepak as Anandhi
 Janaki Devi as Dhanalakshmi alias Dhanam Moorthy
 Rajesh as Chandrasekar 
 Dechina as Baby Anu Moorthy
 Gayatri Jayaraman / Uma Riyaz Khan as Sivasankari
 Muralidhar Raj as Ezhil's Father
 Sumangali as Vadivu
 Fawaz Zayani as Subramani, Pavithra's Husband
 Kiran Mai as Aarthi   
 Unknown as Pavithra, Subramani's Wife                                        
 Jeganathan as Ex-MLA Sethusingam 
 Ghouse Nisha as Uma   
 Swathi Reddy as Ramya                    
 Varun Udhai as Doctor Gowtham  
 Annapoorani as Vanitha
 Arandhangi Manjula as Uma's mother
 Vadivukkarasi as Rajalakshmi

Special Appearances
 Gabriella Sellus as Sundari
 Jishnu Menon as Karthick
 Riya Manoj as Abhirami
 Nidhish Kutty as Ilamukhil
 Aadhish Jatti Jaganathan as Sumo 
 Nimeshika Radhakrishnan as Meera 
 Rahul Ravi as Yuva

Soundtrack
Title song of this series is based on the song "Kannin Maniye" from Manathil Uruthi Vendum.

Awards and honours

Adaptations

References

Notes

External links 

Sun TV original programming
2021 Tamil-language television series debuts
Television shows set in Tamil Nadu
Tamil-language melodrama television series
Tamil-language television soap operas
Tamil-language television shows